This is a list of Government Houses of New Zealand. The two maintained Government Houses serve as residences for the governor-general, serving as the official place of business for the administration, as well as venues for many receptions and state functions.  Sometimes, Government House is used to refer metonymically to the office of governor-general.

Current
 Government House, Auckland, the secondary residence
 Government House, Wellington, the primary residence

Former
 Old Government House, Auckland, now occupied by the University of Auckland

See also
Government Houses of the British Empire